Anton Minárik (born 26 December 1977) is a Slovak judoka.

Achievements

References

1977 births
Living people
Slovak male judoka
Universiade medalists in judo
Universiade bronze medalists for Slovakia
Medalists at the 2001 Summer Universiade